The Mason–Dixon line, also called the Mason and Dixon line or Mason's and Dixon's line, is a demarcation line separating four U.S. states, forming part of the borders of Pennsylvania, Maryland, Delaware, and West Virginia (part of Virginia until 1863). It was surveyed between 1763 and 1767 by Charles Mason and Jeremiah Dixon as part of the resolution of a border dispute involving Maryland, Pennsylvania, and Delaware in colonial America. The dispute had its origins almost a century earlier in the somewhat confusing proprietary grants by King Charles I to Lord Baltimore (Maryland) and by King Charles II to William Penn (Pennsylvania and Delaware).

The largest portion of the Mason–Dixon line, along the southern Pennsylvania border, later became informally known as the boundary between the Southern slave states and Northern free states. This usage came to prominence during the debate around the Missouri Compromise of 1820, when drawing boundaries between slave and free territory was an issue, and resurfaced during the American Civil War, with border states also coming into play. The Confederate States of America claimed the Virginia portion of the line as part of its northern border, although it never exercised meaningful control that far northespecially after West Virginia separated from Virginia and joined the Union as a separate state in 1863. It is still used today in the figurative sense of a line that separates the Northeast and South culturally, politically, and socially (see Dixie).

Background

Maryland's charter of 1632 granted Cecil Calvert land north of the entire length of the Potomac River up to the 40th parallel. A problem arose when Charles II granted a charter for Pennsylvania in 1681. The grant defined Pennsylvania's southern border as identical to Maryland's northern border, but described it differently, as Charles relied on an inaccurate map. The terms of the grant clearly indicate that Charles II and William Penn believed the 40th parallel would intersect the Twelve-Mile Circle around New Castle, Delaware, when in fact it falls north of the original boundaries of the City of Philadelphia, the site of which Penn had already selected for his colony's capital city. Negotiations ensued after the problem was discovered in 1681. A compromise proposed by Charles II in 1682, which might have resolved the issue, was undermined by Penn receiving the additional grant of the "Three Lower Counties" along Delaware Bay, which later became the Delaware Colony, a satellite of Pennsylvania. Maryland considered these lands part of its original grant.

The conflict became more of an issue when settlement extended into the interior of the colonies. In 1732 the Proprietary Governor of Maryland, Charles Calvert, 5th Baron Baltimore, signed a provisional agreement with William Penn's sons, which drew a line somewhere in between and renounced the Calvert claim to Delaware. But later, Lord Baltimore claimed that the document he had signed did not contain the terms he had agreed to, and refused to put the agreement into effect. Beginning in the mid-1730s, violence erupted between settlers claiming various loyalties to Maryland and Pennsylvania. The border conflict would be known as Cresap's War.

Progress was made after a Court of Chancery ruling affirming the 1732 agreement, but the issue remained unresolved until Frederick Calvert, 6th Baron Baltimore ceased contesting the claims on the Maryland side and accepted the earlier agreements. Maryland's border with Delaware was to be based on the Transpeninsular Line and the Twelve-Mile Circle around New Castle. As part of the settlement, the Penns and Calverts commissioned the English team of Charles Mason and Jeremiah Dixon to survey the newly established boundaries between the Province of Pennsylvania, the Province of Maryland, and Delaware Colony.

In 1779, Pennsylvania and Virginia agreed "To extend Mason's and Dixon's line, due west, five degrees of longitude, to be computed from the river Delaware, for the southern boundary of Pennsylvania, and that a meridian, drawn from the western extremity thereof to the northern limit of the said state, be the western boundary of Pennsylvania for ever."

After Pennsylvania abolished slavery in 1781, the east-west part of this line and the Ohio River became a border between slave and free states, with Delaware retaining slavery until the 13th Amendment was ratified in 1865.

Geography of the line

Mason and Dixon's actual survey line began to the south of Philadelphia, Pennsylvania, and extended from a benchmark east to the Delaware River and west to what was then the boundary with western Virginia.

The surveyors also fixed the boundary between Delaware and Pennsylvania and the approximately north–south portion of the boundary between Delaware and Maryland. Most of the Delaware–Pennsylvania boundary is an arc, and the Delaware–Maryland boundary does not run truly north–south because it was intended to bisect the Delmarva Peninsula rather than follow a meridian.

The Maryland–Pennsylvania boundary is an east–west line with an approximate mean latitude of 39°43′20″ N (Datum WGS 84). In reality, the east-west Mason–Dixon line is not a true straight line in the geometric sense, but is instead a series of many adjoining line segments, following a path between latitude 39°43′15″ N and 39°43′23″ N.

In 1774, commissioners from Pennsylvania and Virginia met to negotiate their boundary, which at the time involved Pennsylvania's southern border west of Maryland and its entire western border. Both sides agreed that Pennsylvania's grant made its western border a tracing of the course of the Delaware River, displaced five degrees (approximately 265 miles) to the west. And both sides thought this would place Fort Pitt in Virginia territory (in fact it would not have). Negotiations continued for five years, with a series of proposed lines. In the end, a compromise was reached: the Mason–Dixon line would be extended west to a point five degrees west of the Delaware River. To compensate Pennsylvania for the claimed territory lost, its western boundary would be run due north rather than copying the course of the Delaware River.

The Mason–Dixon line was marked by stones every mile  and "crownstones" every , using stone shipped from England. The Maryland side says "(M)" and the Delaware and Pennsylvania sides say "(P)". Crownstones include the two coats of arms. Today, while a number of the original stones are missing or buried, many are still visible, resting on public land and protected by iron cages.

Mason and Dixon confirmed earlier survey work, which delineated Delaware's southern boundary from the Atlantic Ocean to the "Middle Point" stone (along what is today known as the Transpeninsular Line). They proceeded nearly due north from this to the Pennsylvania border.

Later, the line was marked in places by additional benchmarks and survey markers. The lines have been resurveyed several times over the centuries without substantive changes to Mason's and Dixon's work. The stones may be a few, to a few hundred, feet east or west of the point Mason and Dixon thought they were: in any event, the line drawn from stone to stone forms the legal boundary.

History 

The line was established to end a boundary dispute between the British colonies of Maryland and Pennsylvania/Delaware. Maryland had been granted the territory north of the Potomac River up to the 40th parallel. Pennsylvania's grant defined the colony's southern boundary as following a 12-mile (radius) circle counter-clockwise from the Delaware River until it hit "the beginning of the fortieth degree of Northern latitude." From there the boundary was to follow the 40th parallel due west for five degrees of longitude. But the 40th parallel does not, in fact, intersect the 12-mile circle, instead lying significantly farther north. Thus Pennsylvania's southern boundary as defined in its charter was contradictory and unclear. The most serious problem was that the Maryland claim would put Philadelphia, the major city in Pennsylvania, within Maryland.

The dispute was peacefully resolved in 1767 when the boundary was fixed as follows:
 Between Pennsylvania and Maryland:
 Between Delaware and Maryland:
 The existing east–west transpeninsular line from the Atlantic Ocean to the Chesapeake Bay, as far as its midpoint from the Atlantic.
 A 12-mile (radius) circle around the city of New Castle, Delaware.
 A "tangent line" connecting the midpoint of the transpeninsular line to the western side of the 12-mile circle.
 A "north line" along the meridian (line of longitude) from the tangent point to the Maryland-Pennsylvania border.
 Should any land within the 12-mile circle fall west of the north line, it would remain part of Delaware. (This was indeed the case, and this border is the "arc line".)

The disputants engaged an expert British team, astronomer Charles Mason and surveyor Jeremiah Dixon, to survey what became known as the Mason–Dixon line. It cost the Calverts of Maryland and the Penns of Pennsylvania £3,512 9/ – to have  surveyed with such accuracy. To them the money was well spent, for in a new country there was no other way of establishing ownership.

The Mason–Dixon line is made up of four segments corresponding to the terms of the settlement:
 the tangent line
 the north line
 the arc line
 the 39°43′ N parallel

The most difficult task was fixing the tangent line, as they had to confirm the accuracy of the transpeninsular line midpoint and the 12-mile circle, determine the tangent point along the circle, and then actually survey and monument the border. They then surveyed the north and arc lines. They did this work between 1763 and 1767. This actually left a small wedge of land in dispute between Delaware and Pennsylvania until 1921.

In April 1765, Mason and Dixon began their survey of the more famous Maryland–Pennsylvania line. They were commissioned to run it for a distance of five degrees of longitude west from the Delaware River, fixing the western boundary of Pennsylvania (see the entry for Yohogania County). As a result, the group was forced to quit, and on October 11, they made their final observations,  from their starting point.

In 1784, surveyors David Rittenhouse and Andrew Ellicott and their crew completed the survey of the Mason–Dixon line to the southwest corner of Pennsylvania, five degrees from the Delaware River. Other surveyors continued west to the Ohio River. The section of the line between the southwestern corner of Pennsylvania and the river is the county line between Marshall and Wetzel counties, West Virginia.

As the 20th century moved along and modern roadways came to northeastern Maryland and Delaware, the old boundary line was noted by construction crews, newspaper columnists, and the traveling public. When contractors started working on a section of Route 40, a modern dual highway between Elkton and Glasgow, they discovered a time and weather battered original Mason Dixon Marker. It was relocated to northside of the highway and when the governors of Delaware and Maryland dedicated the highway on June 26, 1941, newspaper reporters took note of the ancient old relic.

Although greatly mangled by traffic in the second half of the twentieth century, it still stands today. But long before bulldozers and other heavy equipment started moving earth for the dual highway before World War II, there were concerns about the preservation of this monument. In 1885, the Cecil Democrat reported that after 119-years, the stone on the road from Elkton to Glasgow had "yielded to the action of the elements and fell over." The editor urged the Cecil County Commissioners, Commissioner of the Land Office, Governor or some public minded citizen to preserve this "old time-honored, moss-covered relic of a generation, which has passed away. . . "

On November 14, 1963, during the bicentennial of the Mason–Dixon line, U.S. President John F. Kennedy opened a newly completed section of Interstate 95 where it crossed the Maryland–Delaware border. After the president, flanked by the governors of Delaware and Maryland, cut a ribbon opening the Interstate, they moved to the grassy median strip where a replica Mason and Dixon Marker had been placed for the bicentennial. There President Kennedy and the governors unveiled a limestone replica. It was one of his last public appearances before his assassination in Dallas, Texas. The Delaware Turnpike and the Maryland portion of the new road were later designated as the John F. Kennedy Memorial Highway.

The Mason–Dixon line has been resurveyed three times: in 1849, 1900, and in the 1960s.

Systematic errors and experiments to weigh the Earth
Mason and Dixon could only do the work as accurately as they did due to the work of Nevil Maskelyne, some of whose instruments they used. There was keen interest in their work and much communication between the surveyors, Maskelyne and other members of the British Scientific establishment in the Royal Society in Britain, notably Henry Cavendish.

During such survey work, it is normal to survey from point to point along the line and then survey back to the starting point, where if there were no errors the origin and re-surveyed position would coincide. Normally the return errors would be randomi.e. the return survey errors compared to the intermediate points back to the start point would be spatially randomly distributed around the start point. Mason and Dixon found that there were larger than expected systematic errors, i.e. non-random errors, that led the return survey consistently being in one direction away from the starting point.

When this information got back to the Royal Society members, Henry Cavendish realised that this may have been due to the gravitational pull of the Allegheny Mountains deflecting the theodolite plumb-bobs and spirit levels. Maskelyne then proposed measuring the gravitational force causing this deflection induced by the pull of a nearby mountain upon a plumb-bob in 1772 and sent Mason (who had returned to Britain) on a site survey through central England and Scotland to find a suitable location during the summer of 1773. Mason selected Schiehallion at which to conduct what became known as the Schiehallion experiment, which was carried out primarily by Maskelyne and determined the density of the Scottish mountain. Several years later Cavendish used a very sensitive torsion balance to carry out the Cavendish experiment and determine the average density of Earth.

In culture

Name
It is unlikely that Mason and Dixon ever heard the phrase "Mason–Dixon line". The official report on the survey, issued in 1768, did not even mention their names. While the term was used occasionally in the decades following the survey, it came into popular use when the Missouri Compromise of 1820 named "Mason and Dixon's line" as part of the boundary between slave territory and free territory.

Symbolism
In popular usage to people from the United States, the Mason–Dixon line symbolizes a cultural boundary between the North and the South (Dixie). Originally "Mason and Dixon's Line" simply referred to the border between Pennsylvania (including "the Delaware Counties") and Maryland. However, it has been used metaphorically to describe the entire boundary between slave and free states during the 19th-century. After Pennsylvania abolished slavery, it served as a demarcation line for the legality of slavery. Technically speaking, that demarcation did not extend beyond Pennsylvania where Virginia, Maryland, and Delaware, all slave states, lay south and east of the boundary. Also lying north and east of the boundary was New Jersey, where slavery was formally abolished in 1846, but former slaves continued to be "apprenticed" to their masters until the passage of the Thirteenth Amendment to the United States Constitution in 1865.

The Missouri Compromise line (Parallel 36°30′ north) had a much clearer geographic connection to slavery in the United States leading up to the Civil War.

In popular culture

Popular culture contains a multitude of references to the Mason–Dixon line as a general geographic division, or character names evoking it, although a minority of those specifically relate to the line itself.

Film
 Mason "The Line" Dixon is a leading character in Rocky Balboa (2006), the sixth film in the Rocky franchise, directed by and starring Sylvester Stallone. Played by real-life boxer Antonio Tarver, Dixon is the current World Heavyweight Boxing Champion who is ridiculed for having never fought a real contender, and who thus agrees to an exhibition fight against the nearly 60-year-old Rocky Balboa.
 In Attack of the Killer Tomatoes (1978), Mason Dixon is the leader of a government task force dedicated to stopping the worldwide crisis when tomatoes turn malignant.

Cartoons
 The line makes several appearances in the 1953 Bugs Bunny cartoon "Southern Fried Rabbit". The line separates the drought-affected North from which the "Yankee" Bugs leaves in search of carrots in the green lands of the "Dixie" South, the latter being guarded by Yosemite Sam, who thinks the Civil War is still ongoing.

Literature
 In the novel People's Choice by Jeff Greenfield, the character of W. Dixon Mason is an African-American preacher who plays a major role in determining the next U.S. President when the elected candidate dies between the popular election and the Electoral College formal vote.
 Mason & Dixon (1997) is the title of a novel by American author Thomas Pynchon. The novel meanders widely through the lives of Mason and Dixon, traditional American history, and other themes such as hollow earth theory, geomancy, deism, andperhapsalien abduction.

Music
 The 1918 song, "Rock-a-Bye Your Baby with a Dixie Melody", written by Jean Schwartz, Sam M. Lewis, and Joe Young, popularized by Al Jolson, includes the lyric "Just hang my cradle, Mammy mine/ Right on that Mason–Dixon Line".
 A small group of musicians from Paul Whiteman's orchestra led by C melody saxophonist Frank Trumbauer and including Bix Beiderbecke recorded two sides for Columbia on May 15, 1929 titled, "Alabammy Snow" and "What A Day!" under the pseudonym, "Mason–Dixon Orchestra". It is probable that they chose this pseudonym because the catalog number of the record would be 1861-D, 1861 being the year that the American Civil War began.
 The lyric "First to cross the Mason–Dixon line" featured in the opening verse of the song "I've Done it Again" (composers Marianne Faithfull / Barry Reynolds) on Grace Jones' 1981 album Nightclubbing.
 The 1955 song, "Hey, Porter", by Johnny Cash makes reference to the Mason–Dixon line in the line, How much longer will it be until we cross that Mason-Dixon line?
 From the 2000 album Sailing to Philadelphia by British singer-songwriter and guitarist Mark Knopfler, the title track (also featuring James Taylor) is about the two English surveyors Charles Mason and Jeremiah Dixon travelling to Philadelphia to survey the Mason–Dixon line; the lyrics draw from Mason & Dixon by Thomas Pynchon, a novel about their relationship.
 Sonic Youth's "Paper Cup Exit" from the album Sonic Nurse (2004) has the line "Touch down on the new Mason-Dixon line" (sang by Lee Ranaldo)
 Dan Seals sung "Mason Dixon line" and the song symbolically references the line.
 GZA references the "Mason-Dixon Line" in the closing words of his feature verse on Raekwon's song "Guillotine (Swords)" from his debut 1995 album Only Built 4 Cuban Linx.
 Tom Lehrer references the Mason–Dixon line in his song "I Wanna Go Back to Dixie".
 Lady Antebellum's eponymous album has a song "Home Is Where The Heart Is," which contains the line "It's just south of the Mason-Dixon line".
 The 1916 song "Are You from Dixie ('Cause I'm from Dixie Too)" originally recorded by Billy Murray contains the lyrics "If you're from Alabama, Tennessee, or Caroline. Any place below the Mason-Dixon line. Then you're from Dixie."
 Brad Paisley, LL Cool J, and Lee Thomas Miller's controversial 2013 song "Accidental Racist" uses the Mason–Dixon line as a metaphor for north–south, black/white, and other cultural (dysfunctional) relations: "Oh, Dixieland/The relationship between the Mason-Dixon needs some fixin'"
 David Allan Coe sings about the Mason Dixon line in 'I still Sing the old songs'
 Connie Smith sings about the Mason Dixon Line in 'Cincinnati, Ohio', lyrics by Bill Anderson
 The 1983 song Dixieland Delight by country singer Ronnie Rogers and recorded by American country music band Alabama references the Mason-Dixon Line multiple times throughout the song.
 The country band Mason Dixon

Sports 
 In the regional baseball rivalry between the New York Yankees and the Boston Red Sox, the theoretical border that separates population centers that are majority-Red Sox fans from majority-Yankees fans in Connecticut is sometimes called the "Munson-Nixon Line", in a (somewhat parodial) reference to the Mason–Dixon line. Credited to Steve Rushin of Sports Illustrated, the line is named for famed Yankee catcher Thurman Munson and Red Sox right fielder Trot Nixon. In the book The Nine Nations of North America, this line is mentioned (but not named) as the true marker of whether a given location in Connecticut is socially part of New England or the rust belt region the author calls The Foundry. This line has moved over the years, but it's still there.

See also

 Collins–Valentine line, the boundary between the province of Quebec and the states of New York and Vermont
 Delaware Boundary Markers
 Penn–Calvert boundary dispute
 Mason and Dixon Survey Terminal Point
 Star Gazers' Stone
 Tofu Curtain
 Weißwurstäquator, a similar border line in Germany between the Northern and Southern areas of the country.

Notes

References

Further reading 
 Danson, Edwin. Drawing the Line: How Mason and Dixon Surveyed the Most Famous Border in America. Wiley. .
 Ecenbarger, Bill. Walkin' the Line: A Journey from Past to Present Along the Mason–Dixon. M. Evans. .

External links

 The Mason and Dixon Line Preservation Partnership Collection of historical articles and pictures
 The Evolution of the Mason and Dixon Line Facsimile copy of this 1902 text available on-line at Penn State's Digital Bookshelf
 
 
 
 Mason and Dixon in Mill Creek, Friends of White Clay Creek State Park
 University of North Carolina: Southern Things
 The history of Mason and Dixon's line; The Historical Society of Pennsylvania (1855)

 
1767 establishments in the Thirteen Colonies
1767 in international relations
Cultural boundaries
Borders of Delaware
Borders of Maryland
Borders of Pennsylvania
Borders of West Virginia
Delaware in the American Civil War
Geographic history of the United States
Historic Civil Engineering Landmarks
History of the Southern United States
History of the Northeastern United States
History of United States expansionism
Surveying of the United States
Circles of latitude
Maryland in the American Civil War
Pennsylvania in the American Civil War
Pre-statehood history of Maryland
Pre-statehood history of Pennsylvania
Pre-statehood history of Virginia
Pre-statehood history of West Virginia
Slavery in the United States
Borders of U.S. states
Meridians (geography)
Eponymous border lines
Northeastern United States